Nocardiopsis flavescens  is a Gram-positive and aerobic bacterium from the genus of Nocardiopsis which has been isolated from the seashore of Lianyungang in China.

References

External links
Type strain of Nocardiopsis flavescens at BacDive -  the Bacterial Diversity Metadatabase	

Actinomycetales
Bacteria described in 2011